Microprius is a genus of cylindrical bark beetles in the family Zopheridae. There are at least two described species in Microprius.

Species
These two species belong to the genus Microprius:
 Microprius rufulus (Motschulsky, 1863)
 Trionus opacus Sharp, 1885

References

Further reading

External links

 

Zopheridae
Articles created by Qbugbot